Glen Liddiard (born 28 November 1969) is an Australian former professional rugby league footballer who played for the Parramatta Eels, Penrith Panthers, North Sydney and South Queensland in the NSWRL/ARL.

Biography
Liddiard played his junior football in Penrith and was an 1986 Australian Schoolboys representative player, while attending Cambridge Park High School.

From 1988 to 1991 he made 46 first-grade appearances for Parramatta in the NSWRL, as a centre, five-eighth and full-back.

In the 1992 NSWRL season, Liddiard joined reigning premiers Penrith and played four first-grade games. He was a passenger in the fatal car crash which killed his teammate Ben Alexander, who was driving.

Liddiard finished his NSWRL/ARL career with one season stints at North Sydney and South Queensland, between which he played for Oldham in England. He then returned to England and played with the Hull Sharks.

He won Penrith's Club Person of the Year Award in 2016 for his role as an Indigenous Welfare Officer.

References

External links
Glen Liddiard at Rugby League project

1969 births
Living people
Australian rugby league players
Hull F.C. players
North Sydney Bears players
Oldham R.L.F.C. players
Parramatta Eels players
Penrith Panthers players
Rugby articles needing expert attention
Rugby league centres
Rugby league five-eighths
Rugby league fullbacks
Rugby league players from Sydney
South Queensland Crushers players